Chorisastrea is an extinct genus of stony corals.

Fossilworks considers Chorisastrea Fromentel 1861 to be a synonym of †Latomeandra Milne-Edwards and Haime 1849 (Latomeandridae).

References

External links 
 Chorisastrea at Muséum National d'Histoire Naturelle, Paris
 Chorisastrea at gbif.org

Scleractinia genera
Prehistoric Hexacorallia genera
Calamophylliidae